Garfors is a surname. Notable people with the surname include:

Gunnar Garfors (born 1975), Norwegian traveler, author, media professional, and public speaker
Gunnar Emil Garfors (1900–1979), Norwegian poet

Norwegian-language surnames